Sir Henry Whatley Tyler (7 March 1827 – 30 January 1908) was a pioneering British engineer and politician, who contributed to the Great Exhibition of 1851 and whose collections helped found the Science Museum in South Kensington. His interests were mainly in railways, where he served Inspector of Railways and a railway company director but also in water and iron working. He was also a Conservative politician who sat in the House of Commons from 1880 to 1892.

Early life
Tyler was born in Mayfair, London, the son of John Chatfield Tyler and attended the Royal Military Academy Woolwich. He received a commission as a Second Lieutenant in the Royal Engineers on 19 December 1844, having previously been a Gentleman Cadet; he was promoted to First Lieutenant on 1 April 1846; and to Second Captain on 31 March 1854. In 1851 he was a lieutenant called upon by Henry Cole to assist with the organisation of the Great Exhibition. In 1860 he donated a set of prospectuses to the State Library of Victoria.

Railway Inspectorate
Tyler was appointed an Inspecting Officer for Railways in 1853—a function which is normally carried out by Royal Engineers officers—holding the position for 24 years. A typical investigation is reported in the press in 1858. Other important investigations included the Wootton bridge collapse and the Clayton Tunnel rail crash, both of which occurred in 1861. The former involved failure of cast iron beams supporting the track in a wooden bridge, through which a coal train fell, killing the driver and stoker instantly. The Clayton tunnel crash involved a collision in the tunnel and was the worst rail disaster at the time, killing 24 passengers in the rear coaches. He also reported on the Bull bridge accident when yet another cast iron girder failed suddenly as a train was passing over.

During his career as a Board of Trade inspector, Tyler was an advocate of railway nationalisation. In 1857, Tyler was granted two patents, no. 592 on 28 February 1857 and no. 1472 on 25 May 1857, both being for the invention of improvements in the permanent way of railways. In February 1866, Tyler was seconded to government service, and he was taken off the strength of the army the following October, his final rank being Captain. His expertise was called upon not only in the UK but also in various locations in Europe. In 1866, he was sent to inspect the railway systems of France and Italy, in order to determine how best to transfer mail destined for India from northern France to the Italian port of Brindisi. On his recommendation the route was accepted.

Later career
In 1867, he investigated London's water supply following an outbreak of cholera, an investigation which involved emptying a reservoir of the East London Waterworks Company next to the river Lea, and tasting the contaminated water. His report helped confirm that cholera was water-borne rather than by the air.

In 1868, he spent two periods of leave building the first railway in Greece from Athens to Piraeus. In 1871, he received promotion to Chief Inspector of Railways, and in 1874 he went to America to inspect the Erie for British investors. He was a member of the abortive Channel Tunnel Commission in 1875 to 1876.

On retirement from the Railway Inspectorate, he became President of the Grand Trunk Railway of Canada in 1877 where he established a successful working relationship with Sir Joseph Hickson. He was also chairman of the Westinghouse Air Brake Company and Deputy Chairman of the Great Eastern Railway Company.

He was a director of National Mutual Assurance and Globe Insurance Company, chairman of the Rhymney Iron Company, chairman of the Peruvian Bondholders Committee and chairman of the Peruvian Corporation.

Political life

At the 1880 general election, Tyler was elected as Conservative Member of Parliament (MP) for Harwich in Essex. In 1882 he objected to a Theosophist article against which he raised a charge of blasphemy and became embroiled in a conflict with Annie Besant. In 1885 he was elected at Great Yarmouth, but lost the seat at the 1892 election. In 1893 he gave up the presidency of the Grand Trunk Railway Company.

Personal life
Tyler married Margaret Pasley, daughter of General Sir Charles Pasley, K.C.B. in 1852. Lady Tyler's Terrace in Rhymney is named after her.

He was interested in homeopathy and contributed large sums of money for the expansion of the London Homeopathic Hospital. His daughter, Margaret Lucy Tyler (1875–1943), was a student of James Tyler Kent and became one of the most influential homeopaths of all time

He died at his home, Linden House in Highgate, north London, on 30 January 1908 and is buried in a family vault at Highgate Cemetery.

See also
Railway Inspectorate

References

Bibliography
PR Lewis, Disaster on the Dee: Robert Stephenson's Nemesis of 1847, Tempus Publishing (2007)

External links 
 

1827 births
1908 deaths
Burials at Highgate Cemetery
English railway mechanical engineers
Royal Engineers officers
Conservative Party (UK) MPs for English constituencies
UK MPs 1880–1885
UK MPs 1885–1886
UK MPs 1886–1892
Politics of the Borough of Great Yarmouth
Directors of the Great Eastern Railway
British railway inspectors